

Events

Pre-1600
 484 – The Arian Vandal Kingdom ceases its persecution of Nicene Christianity. 
 558 – Chlothar I is crowned King of the Franks.
 583 – Maya queen Yohl Ik'nal is crowned ruler of Palenque.
 962 – The Sack of Aleppo as part of the Arab–Byzantine wars: Under the future Emperor Nicephorus Phocas, Byzantine troops storm the city of Aleppo.
1598 – Arauco War: Governor of Chile Martín García Óñez de Loyola is killed in the Battle of Curalaba by Mapuches led by Pelantaru.

1601–1900
1688 – As part of the Glorious Revolution, King James II of England flees from England to Paris, France after being deposed in favor of his son-in-law and nephew, William of Orange and his daughter Mary.
1783 – George Washington resigns as commander-in-chief of the Continental Army at the Maryland State House in Annapolis, Maryland.
1793 – The Battle of Savenay: A decisive defeat of the royalist counter-revolutionaries in War in the Vendée during the French Revolution.
1815 – The novel Emma by Jane Austen is first published.
1876 – First day of the Constantinople Conference which resulted in agreement for political reforms in the Balkans.
1893 – The opera Hansel and Gretel by Engelbert Humperdinck is first performed.

1901–present
1913 – The Federal Reserve Act is signed into law by President Woodrow Wilson, creating the Federal Reserve System.
1914 – World War I: Australian and New Zealand troops arrive in Cairo, Egypt.
1914 – World War I: During the Battle of Sarikamish, Ottoman forces mistook one another for Russian troops. The following friendly fire incident leave 2,000 Ottomans dead and many more wounded.
1916 – World War I: Battle of Magdhaba: Allied forces defeat Turkish forces in the Sinai Peninsula.
1919 – Sex Disqualification (Removal) Act 1919 becomes law in the United Kingdom.
1936 – Colombia becomes a signatory to the Buenos Aires copyright treaty.
1936 – Spanish Civil War: The Spanish Republic legalizes the Regional Defence Council of Aragon.
1941 – World War II: After 15 days of fighting, the Imperial Japanese Army occupies Wake Island.
1947 – The transistor is first demonstrated at Bell Laboratories.
1948 – Seven Japanese military and political leaders convicted of war crimes by the International Military Tribunal for the Far East are executed by Allied occupation authorities at Sugamo Prison in Tokyo, Japan.
1950 – General Walton Walker dies in a jeep accident and is replaced by General Matthew Ridgway in the Eighth United States Army.
1954 – First successful kidney transplant is performed by J. Hartwell Harrison and Joseph Murray.
1955 – The first film adaptation of Väinö Linna's novel The Unknown Soldier, directed by Edvin Laine, premieres.
1960 – Hilkka Saarinen née Pylkkänen is murdered in the so-called the "oven homicide" case in Krootila, Kokemäki, Finland.
  1970   – The Democratic Republic of the Congo officially becomes a one-party state.
1972 – The Immaculate Reception is caught by Franco Harris to win the Pittsburgh Steelers their first ever playoff victory, after defeating the Oakland Raiders.
1972 – A 6.5 magnitude earthquake strikes the Nicaraguan capital of Managua killing more than 10,000.
  1972   – The 16 survivors of the Andes flight disaster are rescued after 73 days, surviving by cannibalism.
1978 – Alitalia Flight 4128 crashes into the Tyrrhenian Sea while on approach to Falcone Borsellino Airport in Palermo, Italy, killing 108.
1979 – Soviet–Afghan War: Soviet Union forces occupy Kabul, the Afghan capital.
1984 – After experiencing an engine fire, Aeroflot Flight 3519 attempts to make an emergency landing at Krasnoyarsk International Airport but crashes, killing 110 of the 111 people on board.
1986 – Voyager, piloted by Dick Rutan and Jeana Yeager, lands at Edwards Air Force Base in California becoming the first aircraft to fly non-stop around the world without aerial or ground refueling.
1990 – History of Slovenia: In a referendum, 88.5% of Slovenia's overall electorate vote for independence from Yugoslavia.
2002 – A U.S. MQ-1 Predator is shot down by an Iraqi MiG-25 in the first combat engagement between a drone and conventional aircraft.
2003 – An explosion at the PetroChina Chuandongbei natural gas field in Kai County, Chongqing, China, kills at least 234.
2005 – An Antonov An-140, Azerbaijan Airlines Flight 217 from Baku, Azerbaijan, to Aktau, Kazakhstan, heading across the Caspian Sea, crashes, killing 23 people.
2007 – An agreement is made for the Kingdom of Nepal to be abolished and the country to become a federal republic with the Prime Minister becoming head of state.
2008 – A coup d'état occurs in Guinea hours after the death of President Lansana Conté.
2015 – A bomb explodes at Istanbul's Sabiha Gökçen Airport, killing one airport cleaner. The Kurdistan Freedom Hawks claim responsibility for the attack four days later.

Births

Pre-1600
 968 – Emperor Zhenzong of Song, emperor of the Song Dynasty (d. 1022)
1173 – Louis I, duke of Bavaria (d. 1231)
1513 – Thomas Smith, English scholar and diplomat (d. 1577)
1525 – John Albert I, duke of Mecklenburg (d. 1576)
1573 – Giovanni Battista Crespi, Italian painter, sculptor and architect (d. 1632)
1582 – Severo Bonini, Italian organist and composer (d. 1663)
1544 – Anna of Saxony, only child and heiress of Maurice, Elector of Saxony (d. 1577)
1597 – Martin Opitz, German poet and composer (d. 1639)

1601–1900
1605 – Tianqi Emperor, Chinese emperor (d. 1627)
1613 – Carl Gustaf Wrangel, Swedish field marshal and politician, Lord High Constable of Sweden (d. 1676)
1621 – Heneage Finch, 1st Earl of Nottingham, English lawyer and politician, Lord Chancellor of England (d. 1682)
  1621   – Edmund Berry Godfrey, English lawyer and judge (d. 1678)
1689 – Joseph Bodin de Boismortier, French composer (d. 1755)
1690 – Pamheiba, Indian emperor (d. 1751)
1713 – Maruyama Gondazaemon, Japanese sumo wrestler, the 3rd Yokozuna (d. 1749)
1732 – Richard Arkwright, English businessman and inventor, invented the Water frame and Spinning frame (d. 1792)
1750 – Frederick Augustus I of Saxony (d. 1827)
1758 – Nathan Wilson, American soldier and politician (d. 1834)
1766 – Wilhelm Hisinger, Swedish physicist and chemist (d. 1852)
1777 – Alexander I of Russia (d. 1825)
1782 – William Armstrong, American lawyer, civil servant, politician, and businessperson (d. 1865)
1790 – Jean-François Champollion, French philologist, orientalist, and scholar (d. 1832)
1793 – Dost Mohammad Khan, emir of Afghanistan (d. 1863)
1804 – Charles Augustin Sainte-Beuve, French author, critic, and academic (d. 1869)
1805 – Joseph Smith, American religious leader, founder of the Latter Day Saint movement (d. 1844)
1807 – Anthony Mary Claret, Spanish Roman Catholic archbishop and missionary (d. 1870)
1810 – Edward Blyth, English zoologist (d. 1873)
  1810   – Karl Richard Lepsius, German Egyptologist (d. 1884)
1812 – Samuel Smiles, Scottish-English author (d. 1904)
  1812   – Henri-Alexandre Wallon, French historian and statesman (d. 1904)
1819 – Jan Jakob Lodewijk ten Kate, Dutch pastor and poet (d. 1889)
1822 – Wilhelm Bauer, German engineer (d. 1875)
1828 – Mathilde Wesendonck, German poet and author (d. 1902)
1839 – János Murkovics, Slovene-Hungarian author and educator (d. 1917)
1843 – Richard Conner, American sergeant, Medal of Honor recipient (d. 1924)
1854 – Henry B. Guppy, English botanist and author (d. 1926)
1865 – James M. Canty, American educator, school administrator, and businessperson (d. 1964)
1867 – Madam C. J. Walker American businesswoman and philanthropist (d. 1919)
1870 – John Marin, American painter (d. 1953)
1878 – Stephen Timoshenko, Ukrainian-American engineer and academic (d. 1972)
1885 – Pierre Brissaud, French illustrator, painter, and engraver (d. 1964)
1894 – Arthur Gilligan, English cricketer (d. 1976)
1895 – Nola Luxford, New Zealand-American actress and broadcaster (d. 1994)
1896 – Giuseppe Tomasi di Lampedusa, Italian lieutenant and author (d. 1957)
1900 – Merle Barwis, American-Canadian supercentenarian (d. 2014)
  1900   – Marie Bell, French actress and stage director (d. 1985)
  1900   – Otto Soglow, American cartoonist (d. 1975)

1901–present
1902 – Norman Maclean, American author and academic (d. 1990)
  1902   – Charan Singh, Indian lawyer and politician, 5th Prime Minister of India (d. 1987)
1907 – Manuel Lopes, Cape Verdean author and poet (d. 2005)
  1907   – James Roosevelt, American general and politician (d. 1991)
  1907   – Avraham Stern, Polish Zionist leader (d. 1942)
1908 – Gertrude Bancroft, American economist (d. 1985)
1908 – Yousuf Karsh, Armenian-Canadian photographer (d. 2002)
1910 – Kurt Meyer, German general (d. 1961)
1911 – James Gregory, American actor (d. 2002)
  1911   – Niels Kaj Jerne, English-Danish physician and immunologist, Nobel Prize laureate (d. 1994)
1912 – Anna J. Harrison, American organic chemist and academic (d. 1998)
  1912   – Woodrow Borah, American historian of Spanish America (d. 1999)
1916 – Dino Risi, Italian director and screenwriter (d. 2008)
1918 – José Greco, Italian-American dancer and choreographer (d. 2000)
  1918   – Helmut Schmidt, German soldier, economist, and politician, 5th Chancellor of Germany (d. 2015)
1919 – Kenneth M. Taylor, American general and pilot (d. 2006)
1921 – Guy Beaulne, Canadian actor and director (d. 2001)
1922 – Micheline Ostermeyer, French discus thrower, shot putter, and pianist (d. 2001)
1923 – Onofre Marimón, Argentinian race car driver (d. 1954)
  1923   – Günther Schifter, Austrian journalist and radio host (d. 2008)
  1923   – James Stockdale, American admiral and pilot, Medal of Honor recipient (d. 2005)
1924 – Bob Kurland, American basketball player and politician (d. 2013)
1925 – Duncan Hallas, English author and politician (d. 2002)
  1925   – Rayner Unwin, English publisher (d. 2000)
1926 – Robert Bly, American poet and essayist (d. 2021)
  1926   – Harold Dorman, American singer-songwriter (d. 1988)
1929 – Chet Baker, American jazz trumpet player, flugelhorn player, and singer (d. 1988)
  1929   – Dick Weber, American professional bowler (d. 2005)
1932 – Richard Clark Barkley, American soldier, academic, and diplomat, United States Ambassador to East Germany (d. 2015)
1933 – Akihito, Japanese emperor
  1933   – Noella Leduc, American baseball player (d. 2014)
1935 – Paul Hornung, American football player and sportscaster (d. 2020)
  1935   – Johnny Kidd, English singer-songwriter (d. 1966)
  1935   – Abdul Ghani Minhat, Malaysian footballer and manager (d. 2012)
  1935   – Esther Phillips, American R&B singer (d. 1984)
1936 – Bobby Ross, American football player and coach
  1936   – Willie Wood, American football player (d. 2020)
1937 – Barney Rosenzweig, American screenwriter and producer
  1937   – Nelson Shanks, American painter, historian, and educator (d. 2015)
1938 – Bob Kahn, American computer scientist and engineer, co-developed the Transmission Control Protocol
1939 – Nancy Graves, American sculptor and painter (d. 1995)
1940 – Mamnoon Hussain, Pakistani businessman and politician, 12th President of Pakistan (d. 2021)
  1940   – Jorma Kaukonen, American singer-songwriter and guitarist 
  1940   – Robert Labine, Canadian politician (d. 2021)
  1940   – Jeanie Lambe, Scottish jazz singer (d. 2020)
  1940   – Kevin Longbottom, Australian rugby league player (d. 1986) 
  1940   – Eugene Record, American soul singer-songwriter (d. 2005)
1941 – Peter Davis, English businessman
  1941   – Tim Hardin, American folk singer-songwriter and musician (d. 1980)
1942 – Quentin Bryce, Australian lawyer and politician, 25th Governor-General of Australia
1943 – Ron Allen, American baseball player
  1943   – Mikhail Leonidovich Gromov, Russian-French mathematician and academic
  1943   – Terry Peder Rasmussen, American serial killer (d. 2010)
  1943   – Harry Shearer, American actor, voice artist, and comedian 
  1943   – Queen Silvia of Sweden
1944 – Wesley Clark, American general
  1945   – Adly Mansour, Egyptian lawyer, judge, and politician, President of Egypt
  1945   – Geoffrey Wheatcroft, English journalist and author
1946 – Robbie Dupree, American singer-songwriter
  1946   – Edita Gruberová, Slovak soprano and actress (d. 2021)
  1946   – Susan Lucci, American actress
  1946   – John Sullivan, English screenwriter, producer, and composer (d. 2011)
1947 – Bill Rodgers, American runner
1948 – David Davis, English politician, Minister of State for Europe
  1948   – Jim Ferguson, American guitarist, composer, and journalist
  1948   – Jack Ham, American football player and sportscaster
  1948   – Rick Wohlhuter, American runner
1949 – Adrian Belew, American singer-songwriter and guitarist 
  1949   – Reinhold Weege, American screenwriter and producer (d. 2012)
1950 – Michael C. Burgess, American obstetrician and politician
  1950   – Richard Dannatt, Baron Dannatt, English general
  1950   – Vicente del Bosque, Spanish footballer and manager
  1950   – Ilchi Lee, South Korean author and educator
1951 – Anthony Phillips, English guitarist and songwriter 
1952 – William Kristol, American journalist, publisher, and political activist/pundit 
1953 – Andres Alver, Estonian architect and academic
  1953   – Gerrit W. Gong, American religious leader and academic
1954 – Raivo Järvi, Estonian radio host and politician (d. 2012)
  1954   – Brian Teacher, American tennis player
1955 – Carol Ann Duffy, Scottish poet and playwright
  1955   – Grace Knight, English-Australian singer-songwriter 
1956 – Michele Alboreto, Italian race car driver (d. 2001)
  1956   – Dave Murray, English guitarist and songwriter 
1957 – Dan Bigras, Canadian singer-songwriter 
  1957   – Peter Wynn, Australian rugby league player and businessman
1958 – Joan Severance, American actress
  1958   – Victoria Williams, American singer-songwriter 
1961 – Ezzat el Kamhawi, Egyptian journalist and author
  1961   – Ketan J. Patel, Kenyan-English biologist and academic
  1961   – Carol Smillie, Scottish model and actress
  1961   – Lorna Tolentino, Filipino actress and producer
1962 – Bertrand Gachot, Belgian race car driver
  1962   – Stefan Hell, Romanian-German physicist and chemist, Nobel Prize laureate 
  1962   – Kang Je-gyu, South Korean director, producer, and screenwriter
  1962   – Keiji Mutoh, Japanese wrestler and actor
1963 – Jim Harbaugh, American football player and coach
  1963   – Jess Harnell, American singer-songwriter and voice actor
  1963   – Donna Tartt, American author
  1963   – Ante Zelck, German businessman
1964 – Eddie Vedder, American singer-songwriter and guitarist 
1966 – Badi Assad, Brazilian singer-songwriter and guitarist
1967 – Carla Bruni, Italian-French singer-songwriter and model
  1967   – Otis Grant, Jamaican-Canadian boxer, coach, and manager
1968 – Karyn Bryant, American journalist, actress, producer, and screenwriter
  1968   – Barry Kooser, American painter and animator
  1968   – Manuel Rivera-Ortiz, Puerto Rican-American photographer
  1968   – René Tretschok, German footballer and manager
1970 – Catriona LeMay Doan, Canadian speed skater and sportscaster
  1970   – Raymont Harris, American football player
  1970   – Karine Polwart, Scottish singer-songwriter and guitarist 
1971 – Chris Cook, American race car driver
  1971   – Corey Haim, Canadian actor (d. 2010)
  1971   – Jo Johnson, English banker, journalist, and politician
  1971   – Michalis Klokidis, Greek footballer
  1971   – Tara Palmer-Tomkinson, English model, actress, and author (d. 2017)
  1971   – Wim Vansevenant, Belgian cyclist
  1971   – Masayoshi Yamazaki, Japanese singer-songwriter
1972 – Christian Potenza, Canadian actor, voice actor and singer
  1972   – Morgan, Italian singer-songwriter and composer
1974 – Agustín Delgado, Ecuadorian footballer and politician
  1974   – Mieszko Talarczyk, Polish-Swedish singer-songwriter, guitarist, and producer (d. 2004)
1975 – Vadim Sharifijanov, Russian ice hockey player
  1975   – Lady Starlight, American singer-songwriter
1976 – Joanna Hayes, American hurdler and coach
  1976   – Brad Lidge, American baseball player
  1976   – Dimitris Mavrogenidis, Uzbek-Greek footballer and manager
  1976   – Jamie Noble, American wrestler and producer
1977 – Matt Baker, English television presenter
  1977   – Alge Crumpler, American football player
  1977   – Tore Johansen, Norwegian trumpeter and composer 
  1977   – Jari Mäenpää, Finnish singer-songwriter and guitarist 
  1977   – Paul Shirley, American basketball player and blogger
1978 – Esthero, Canadian-American singer-songwriter and producer
  1978   – Andra Davis, American football player
  1978   – Víctor Martínez, Venezuelan baseball player
  1978   – Estella Warren, Canadian swimmer, model, and actress
1979 – Abraham Chebii, Kenyan runner
  1979   – Scott Gomez, American ice hockey player
  1979   – Megan Mayhew Bergman, American author and educator
  1979   – Kenny Miller, Scottish footballer
  1979   – Yukifumi Murakami, Japanese javelin thrower
1980 – Cody Ross, American baseball player
1981 – Maritza Correia, Puerto Rican-American swimmer
  1981   – Yuriorkis Gamboa, Cuban boxer
  1981   – Hiro Fujiwara, Japanese manga artist
  1981   – Agnes Milowka, Polish-Australian diver, explorer, photographer, and author (d. 2011)
  1981   – Mario Santana, Argentinian footballer
1982 – Brad Nelson, American baseball player
  1982   – Thomas Rohregger, Austrian cyclist
1983 – Michael Chopra, English footballer
  1983   – Lisa Dobriskey, English runner
  1983   – Hanley Ramírez, Dominican baseball player
1984 – Dudu Aharon, Israeli singer-songwriter
  1984   – Josh Satin, American baseball player
  1984   – Sebastian Werle, German rugby player
1985 – Harry Judd, English drummer and songwriter 
1986 – Thomas Bourgin, French motorcycle racer (d. 2013)
  1986   – Beau Champion, Australian rugby league player
  1986   – Balázs Dzsudzsák, Hungarian footballer
  1986   – T. J. Oshie, American ice hockey player
1987 – Tommaso Bellazzini, Italian footballer
  1987   – Owen Franks, New Zealand rugby player
1988 – Mallory Hagan, Miss America 2013
1989 – Liis Koger, Estonian painter and poet
1992 – Jeff Schlupp, German footballer
1994 – Reed Alexander, American actor
1996 – Bartosz Kapustka, Polish footballer
2002 – Finn Wolfhard, Canadian actor and musician

Deaths

Pre-1600
 423 – Ming Yuan Di, ruler of Northern Wei (b. 392)
 484 – Huneric, Vandal king
 668 – Gabriel of Beth Qustan, bishop and saint (b. 594)
 679 – Dagobert II, Frankish king (probable; b. 650)
 761 – Gaubald, Frankish bishop (b. 700)
 889 – Solomon II, bishop of Constance
 910 – Naum of Preslav, Bulgarian missionary and scholar
 918 – Conrad I, king of East Francia (b. 890)
 940 – Ar-Radi, Abbasid caliph (b. 909)
1172 – Ugo Ventimiglia, Italian cardinal
1193 – Thorlak, patron saint of Iceland (b. 1133)
1230 – Berengaria of Navarre, queen of England (b. 1165)
1304 – Matilda of Habsburg, duchess regent of Bavaria  (b. 1253)
1383 – Beatrice of Bourbon, Queen of Bohemia (b. 1320)
1384 – Thomas Preljubović, ruler of Epirus
1392 – Isabella of Castile, duchess of York (b. 1355)
1556 – Nicholas Udall, English cleric, playwright, and educator (b. 1504)
1572 – Johann Sylvan, German theologian (executed; date of birth unknown)
1575 – Akiyama Nobutomo, Japanese samurai (b. 1531)
1588 – Henry I, duke of Guise (b. 1550)

1601–1900
1631 – Michael Drayton, English poet and playwright (b. 1563)
1638 – Barbara Longhi, Italian painter (b. 1552)
1646 – François Maynard, French poet and academic (b. 1582)
1652 – John Cotton, English minister and theologian (b. 1585)
1675 – Caesar, duc de Choiseul, French general and diplomat (b. 1602)
1722 – Pierre Varignon, French mathematician and academic (b. 1654)
1761 – Alastair Ruadh MacDonnell, Scottish spy (b. 1725)
1771 – Marie-Marguerite d'Youville, Canadian nun and saint, founded Grey Nuns (b. 1701)
1779 – Augustus Hervey, 3rd Earl of Bristol, English admiral and politician, Chief Secretary for Ireland (b. 1724)
1789 – Charles-Michel de l'Épée, French priest and educator (b. 1712)
1795 – Henry Clinton, English general and politician (b. 1730)
1805 – Pehr Osbeck, Swedish explorer and author (b. 1723)
1834 – Thomas Robert Malthus, English economist and demographer (b. 1766)
1884 – John Chisum, American businessman and poker player (b. 1824)
1889 – Constance Naden, English poet and philosopher (b. 1858)
1892 – Frederick Tracy Dent, Brigadier General in the Regular United States Army, brother in law to President Ulysses S. Grant.

1901–present
1902 – Frederick Temple, English archbishop and academic (b. 1821)
1906 – Mdungazwe Ngungunyane Nxumalo, last emperor of the Gaza Empire (b. c.1850)
1912 – Otto Schoetensack, German anthropologist and academic (b. 1850)
1926 – Swami Shraddhanand, Indian monk, missionary, and educator (b. 1856)
1930 – Mustafa Fehmi Kubilay, Turkish lieutenant and educator (b. 1906)
1931 – Wilson Bentley, American meteorologist and photographer (b. 1865)
1939 – Anthony Fokker, Indonesia-born Dutch pilot and engineer, designed the Fokker Dr.I and Fokker D.VII (b. 1890)
1946 – John A. Sampson, American gynecologist and academic (b. 1873)
1948 – Akira Mutō, Japanese general (b. 1883)
  1948   – Hideki Tojo, Japanese general and politician, 40th Prime Minister of Japan (b. 1884)
  1948   – Seishirō Itagaki, Japanese general (b. 1885)
  1948   – Heitarō Kimura, Japanese general (b. 1888)
  1948   – Iwane Matsui, Japanese general (b. 1878)
  1948   – Kenji Doihara, Japanese general (b. 1883)
  1948   – Kōki Hirota, Japanese diplomat and politician, 32nd Prime Minister of Japan (b. 1878)
1950 – Vincenzo Tommasini, Italian composer (b. 1878)
1953 – Lavrentiy Beria,  Soviet general and politician, head of the People's Commissariat for Internal Affairs  (b. 1899)
1954 – René Iché, French soldier and sculptor (b. 1897)
1961 – Carolyn Sherwin Bailey, American author (b. 1875)
  1961   – Kurt Meyer, German general (b. 1910)
1970 – Charles Ruggles, American actor (b. 1886)
  1970   – Aleksander Warma, Estonian lieutenant and politician, Prime Minister of Estonia in exile (b. 1890)
1972 – Andrei Tupolev, Russian engineer, designed the Tupolev Tu-95 and Tupolev Tu-104 (b. 1888)
1973 – Charles Atlas, Italian-American bodybuilder and model (b. 1892)
  1973   – Irna Phillips, American screenwriter, created Guiding Light and As the World Turns (b. 1901)
1979 – Peggy Guggenheim, American-Italian art collector (b. 1898)
1982 – Jack Webb, American actor, director, producer, and screenwriter (b. 1920)
1983 – Colin Middleton, Irish painter and illustrator (b. 1910)
1984 – Joan Lindsay, Australian author and playwright (b. 1896)
1992 – Vincent Fourcade, French interior designer (b. 1934)
1994 – Sebastian Shaw, English actor, director, and playwright (b. 1905)
1995 – Patric Knowles, English actor (b. 1911)
1998 – Joe Orlando, Italian-American author and illustrator (b. 1927)
2000 – Billy Barty, American actor (b. 1924)
  2000   – Victor Borge, Danish-American comedian, pianist, and conductor (b. 1909)
2001 – Bola Ige, Nigerian lawyer and politician, 3rd Governor of Oyo State (b. 1930)
2004 – P. V. Narasimha Rao, Indian lawyer and politician, 9th Prime Minister of India (b. 1921)
2005 – Lajos Baróti, Hungarian footballer and manager (b. 1914)
2006 – Charlie Drake, English actor (b. 1925)
  2006   – Timothy J. Tobias, American pianist and composer (b. 1952)
  2006   – Johnny Vincent, English footballer (b. 1947)
2007 – William Francis Ganong, Jr., American physiologist and academic (b. 1924)
  2007   – Michael Kidd, American dancer and choreographer (b. 1915)
  2007   – Oscar Peterson, Canadian pianist and composer (b. 1925)
2009 – Robert L. Howard, American colonel, Medal of Honor recipient (b. 1939)
  2009   – Ngapoi Ngawang Jigme, Tibetan general and politician (b. 1910)
  2009   – Edward Schillebeeckx, Belgian theologian and academic (b. 1914)
2010 – Fred Hargesheimer, American soldier and pilot (b. 1916)
  2010   – K. Karunakaran, Indian lawyer and politician, 7th Chief Minister of Kerala (b. 1918)
2011 – Aydın Menderes, Turkish economist and politician (b. 1946)
2012 – Jean Harris, American educator and murderer (b. 1923)
  2012   – Eduardo Maiorino, Brazilian mixed martial artist and kick-boxer (b. 1979)
2013 – Chryssa, Greek-American sculptor (b. 1933)
  2013   – Mikhail Kalashnikov, Russian general and weapons designer, designed the AK-47 rifle (b. 1919)
  2013   – Yusef Lateef, American saxophonist, composer, and educator (b. 1920)
  2013   – Ricky Lawson, American drummer and composer (b. 1954)
  2013   – G. S. Shivarudrappa, Indian poet and educator (b. 1926)
  2013   – Robert W. Wilson, American philanthropist and art collector (b. 1928)
2014 – Edward Greenspan, Canadian lawyer and author (b. 1944)
  2014   – Robert V. Hogg, American statistician and academic (b. 1924)
2015 – Alfred G. Gilman, American pharmacologist and biochemist, Nobel Prize laureate (b. 1941)
  2015   – Don Howe, English footballer and manager (b. 1935)
  2015   – Jean-Marie Pelt, French biologist, pharmacist, and academic (b. 1933)
  2015   – Bülent Ulusu, Turkish admiral and politician, 18th Prime Minister of Turkey (b. 1923)
2017 – Maurice Hayes, Irish educator and politician (b. 1927)
2020 – Leslie West, American singer and guitarist (b. 1945) 
2021 – Joan Didion, American writer (b. 1934)
2022 – Brandon Montrell, American TikTok personality and stand-up comedian (b. 1979)

Holidays and observances 
Birthday of the Queen Silvia, an official flag flying day (Sweden)
Children's Day (South Sudan and Sudan)
Christian Feast Day:
Abassad (Coptic Church)
Behnam, Sarah, and the Forty Martyrs (Coptic Church)
Dagobert II
John Cantius
O Emmanuel
Psote (Coptic Church)
Thorlac Thorhallsson, patron saint of Iceland; The last day of preparations before Christmas.
Victoria
December 23 (Eastern Orthodox liturgics)
Day of all level operational control structures servicemen (Ukraine)
Festivus, a secular holiday made popular by the sitcom Seinfeld
HumanLight (Secular humanism in United States)
Kisan Diwas (Uttar Pradesh, India) 
Night of the Radishes (Oaxaca City, Mexico)
Tibb's Eve (Newfoundland and Labrador)
Tom Bawcock's Eve (Mousehole, Cornwall)
Victory Day (Egypt)

References

External links

 BBC: On This Day
 
 Historical Events on December 23

Days of the year
December